Ungmennafélagið Hvöt, commonly known as Hvöt or Hvöt Blönduós, is an Icelandic multi-sport club from the town of Blönduós located in the north of Iceland.

Football

Men's football
On 12 June 2002, Björn Vignir Björns­son played a senior team game with Hvöt along with three of his sons; Finnur, Óskar and Vignir. It was founded in 1924.

In 2008, comedians and TV-hosts Auðunn Blöndal and Egill Einarsson joined the team.

In November 2007, Kristján Óli Sigurðsson was hired as the head coach of the Hvöt men's team.

References

External links
 Official Website

Football clubs in Iceland